Lizton is a town in Union Township, Hendricks County, Indiana, United States. The population was 488 at the 2010 Census.  It is one of the three towns (Pittsboro and North Salem being the other two) that make up North West Hendricks School Corporation.

History
Lizton was originally called New Elizabeth, and under the latter name was laid out in 1837 by Jesse Veiley, and named for his wife, Elizabeth.

The post office was established as New Elizabeth in 1854, and was renamed Lizton in 1873. According to one source, the name may have been changed by the railroad.

Geography
 
Lizton is located at  (39.885274, -86.544207).

Demographics

2010 census
As of the census of 2010, there were 488 people, 197 households, and 137 families living in the town. The racial makeup of the town was 97.3% White, 0.4% Asian, 0.8% from other races, and 1.4% from two or more races. Hispanic or Latino of any race were 1.4% of the population.

There were 197 households, of which 39.6% had children under the age of 18 living with them, 45.7% were married couples living together, 15.7% had a female householder with no husband present, 8.1% had a male householder with no wife present, and 30.5% were non-families. 26.4% of all households were made up of individuals, and 5.1% had someone living alone who was 65 years of age or older. The average household size was 2.48 and the average family size was 2.96.

The median age in the town was 32.1 years. 28.5% of residents were under the age of 18; 7% were between the ages of 18 and 24; 34.7% were from 25 to 44; 22.3% were from 45 to 64; and 7.6% were 65 years of age or older. The gender makeup of the town was 53.1% male and 46.9% female.

2000 census
As of the census of 2000, there were 372 people, 161 households, and 100 families living in the town. The racial makeup of the town was 98.39% White, 0.27% African American, and 1.34% from two or more races.

There were 161 households, out of which 37.9% had children under the age of 18 living with them, 44.1% were married couples living together, 11.8% had a female householder with no husband present, and 37.3% were non-families. 33.5% of all households were made up of individuals, and 11.2% had someone living alone who was 65 years of age or older. The average household size was 2.31 and the average family size was 2.94.

In the town, the population was spread out, with 26.9% under the age of 18, 7.8% from 18 to 24, 36.3% from 25 to 44, 18.8% from 45 to 64, and 10.2% who were 65 years of age or older. The median age was 33 years. For every 100 females, there were 96.8 males. For every 100 females age 18 and over, there were 94.3 males.

The median income for a household in the town was $40,694, and the median income for a family was $55,313. Males had a median income of $36,023 versus $23,750 for females. The per capita income for the town was $20,269. About 3.0% of families and 3.1% of the population were below the poverty line, including 1.5% of those under age 18 and 3.6% of those age 65 or over.

Education

Schools
Tri-West Hendricks High School
Tri-West Middle School
Both schools are part of the North West Hendricks School Corporation.

Notable people
 Peyton Hendershot, NFL tight end for the Dallas Cowboys

References

External links
 Town of Lizton, Indiana website

Towns in Hendricks County, Indiana
Towns in Indiana
Indianapolis metropolitan area